Mohammad Hassan Ansarifard (born 9 September 1962) is an Iranian former footballer who played for Persepolis and the Iranian national team. He is currently the president of Persepolis F.C. since 27 August 2019. He was also president of Persepolis F.C. from 2005 until 2007, and also managing director of Rah Ahan F.C. from 2007 to 2012. He is the younger brother of Abbas Ansarifard.

Playing career
He started his football career before the Iranian revolution, playing with Homayoun F.C.. After the revolution he played for Shahin F.C. and Takavar F.C.. In 1985, he moved to Persepolis F.C. and stayed there until 1992. He was a member of the Iranian national team during the same time.

Honours

Club
Persepolis
Hazfi Cup (2): 1987–88, 1991–92
Tehran Province League (4): 1987–88, 1988–89, 1989–90, 1990–91
Asian Cup Winners' Cup (1): 1990–91

National
Iran
Asian Games Gold Medal (1): 1990

Coaching career
He began his coaching career in Fath F.C., soon moving to Payanehaye Isfahan. He also had a brief coaching stint in Mashhad, coaching Partsazan. He then was asked to coach the Iranian national futsal team. He was very successful there, winning numerous Asian Championships and helping the team qualify for the World Cup of Futsal. He left the team after three years, and became head coach of Persepolis' futsal club. His time there was short, and he moved to Iran Khodro futsal club, helping them win the national league.

Administrative career

IRIFF
Ansarifard was a transitory board member of the Islamic Republic of Iran Football Federation from 17 December 2006, to 8 May 2010.

Persepolis
On 5 December 2005, by three votes to two, he was chosen to be Persepolis' chairman after the resignation of Hojatollah Khatib. In April 2007, Ansarifard resigned from his post because of pressure from political board members.

In late April 2007 Ansarifard submitted his resignation to Ali Saeedlu in protest at the intervention of Physical Education on appointing several new managers into the club management committee. It was reported that Persepolis management has accepted Ansarifard's resignation, however this was not the case, and Ansarifard remained as chairman of Persepolis until the end of the 2006/07 season.

Rah Ahan
Ansarifard became chairman of IPL side Rah Ahan F.C. on 1 August 2007. He resigned effective on 12 July 2012.

Notes

External links

 Ansarifard at fc-perspolis.com

Iranian footballers
Iranian football managers
Keshavarz players
Persepolis F.C. players
People from Tehran
1961 births
Living people
Iranian football chairmen and investors
Iran international footballers
1988 AFC Asian Cup players
Asian Games gold medalists for Iran
Iranian futsal coaches
Persepolis FSC managers
Iran national futsal team managers
Asian Games medalists in football
Footballers at the 1990 Asian Games
Association football midfielders
Medalists at the 1990 Asian Games